Agua Prieta is a town in Agua Prieta Municipality in the northeastern corner of the Mexican state of Sonora. It stands on the Mexico–U.S. border, adjacent to the town of Douglas, Arizona. The municipality covers an area of 3,631.65 km2 (1,402.2 sq mi).  In the 2010 census the town had a population of 79,138 people, making it the seventh-largest community in the state, and a literacy rate of 96.3%.

The city's most important economic activities, in descending order, are industry, commerce and farming. 89% of the homes in the city have electricity, 94% have running water, and 86% are connected to the sewer system. The city is the location of the CFE Agua Prieta power plant. It is connected to the United States by the Douglas, Arizona Port of Entry, and is linked to the rest of Mexico by Federal Highways 2 and 17.

History
Agua Prieta city began at the end of the 19th century as railroads were built between Douglas, Arizona, and Nacozari, Sonora, to transport minerals and goods.  As a result, the first settlers of the city, then just a few blocks, were those employed by the U.S. mining company Phelps Dodge Corporation, which was based in Douglas, Arizona. One can say that the town was "founded" in 1899, but it was not  until a "contract" was made in 1903 between officials and private citizens, to the name Camou, that area "pertaining" to those citizens was made a Commissary of Fronteras county. Agua Prieta city did not become an "independent head of municipality," with its current name and location, until August 28, 1916. Rodolfo L. Márquez was the new municipality's first president.  It rose to the status of villa (town) on May 8, 1933, and it was "officially" placed in its current category of city relatively recently, on November 6, 1942.

Climate 
The climate is cold semi-arid (Köppen: BSk). In a latitude over the geographic subtropics, located in a plateau and in the interior of the continent gives a cold winter but at the same time a climatic pattern often dry and with great thermal amplitude during the day. And on the other hand the summer is very hot due to the absence of cloud cover and the air dry with average in the afternoon well above 30 °C. Most of the time there is no precipitation, but a considerable amount of rain falls between July and August.

Culture
Los Apson was one of the most successful musical bands during the second half of the 60s; all original members originated from (A)gua (P)rieta, (Son)ora, hence their name.  They led the phenomenon known in Mexico as the "northern invasion".  Along with the British influence, Los Apson was one of the main decisive elements that brought new nuances to the Mexican musical movement.

Sports
The main sport in Agua Prieta is baseball, closely followed by soccer and basketball. Agua Prieta's professional baseball team is the Toros de Agua Prieta. In 2012, Agua Prieta had its first ever Olympian when Luis Alberto Rivera represented Mexico in the long jump at the XXX Olympic Games in London, UK.

Economy
Agua Prieta II is the first integrated solar combined cycle (ISCC) power plant in Mexico – one of the first power plants of its type in the world – and it is being equipped with the SPPA-E3000 low-voltage switchgear solution from Siemens Mexico Energy. Agua Prieta II is a combined-cycle power plant (CCPP) that has been extended with a solar field and parabolic trough collectors. In this type of power plant, the steam generated by the solar field is fed into the water-steam cycle of the CCPP to increase steam turbine output and reduce carbon dioxide emissions. The power plant in Mexico will have an output of approximately 465 Megawatts (MW) with a contribution from the solar field of 12 MW, it will supply electricity to northwest Mexico. The end customer is the Mexican state power provider Comisión Federal de Electricidad, which already operates two plants of the same type in Morocco and Algeria.

Agua Prieta is home to several maquiladoras, including Levolor, Commercial Vehicle Group, Joyson Safety Systems, Velcro, Standex-Meder Electronics, and Alstyle Apparel & Activewear (Gildan).

Politics
The Plan of Agua Prieta was a political manifesto signed in the city of Agua Prieta on April 23, 1920, by the governor of Sonora, Adolfo de la Huerta, and Plutarco Elías Calles in support of Álvaro Obregón, with the principal objective of bringing an end to the presidency of Venustiano Carranza, who was forced to flee Mexico City and was killed a month later. The Plan of Agua Prieta used as its political banner the 1917 Constitution, with which Carranza had not complied. It also advocated the convening of elections, appointed Huerta as supreme commander of the Constitutionalist Army, and dictated the rules for electing a provisional president, resulting in Huerta being named president by Congress in June.

Agua Prieta played an important role in the Mexican Revolution. Plutarco Elías Calles and Lázaro Cárdenas, two future presidents of Mexico, both lived in the town during its early years. In 1914, the Hotel Central, a now-demolished hotel in the center of the city, was the seat of Carranza's constitutional government. In 1915, Pancho Villa made a night attack on Agua Prieta that was repelled by the forces of Plutarco Elías Calles, assisted by large searchlights (possibly powered by American electricity). The Plan de Agua Prieta, a manifesto which called for the rejection of the government headed by Venustiano Carranza, was signed in a curiosity shop near the international border in 1920. The army headed by Álvaro Obregón eventually deposed Carranza.

List of mayors
1952–1954
Don Jesus Siqueiros
PRI 

1964–1967	
Antonio B. Loreto Barthelemy
PRI 

1979–1982
Luis Córdova Corrales
PAN 
 
1982–1985
Leonardo Yáñez Vargas
PAN 
 
1985–1988
Bernardino Meza Ortíz
PRI 
 
1988–1991
Baudelio Vildósola Teran
PRI 
 
1991–1994
Bernardino Ibarrola Serrano
PRI 
 
1994–1997
Óscar Ochoa Patrón
PAN 
 
1997–2000
Vicente Terán Uribe
PRI 
 
2000–2003
Irma Villalobos Rascón
PRI 
 
2003–2006
David Figueroa Ortega
PAN 

2006–2009
Antonio Cuadras
PRI 

2009–2012
Vicente Terán Uribe
PSD

2012 (March – September)
Francisco Javier Carrera Hernandez
PRI 

2012–2015
Irma Villalobos Rascón
PRI 

2015–2018
Héctor David Rubalcava Gastélum
PAN 

2018–2021
Jesús Alfonso Montaño Durazo
Morena 

2021–2024
Jesús Alfonso Montaño Durazo
Morena

Notable people
 Zarela Martinez, New York City-based Mexican restaurateur and cookbook author
 Los Apson, early 1960s rock band named for the town (Agua Prieta SONora)
 {Carlos Valenzuela}, International beauty expert, motivational speaker, author of award-winning Letters to Young Carlos.

See also

San Bernardino, Sonora

Notes

References

External links

 Gobierno Municipal de Agua Prieta Official website
Sonora Enciclopedia de los Municipios de México.
Link to tables of population data from Census of 2010 INEGI: Instituto Nacional de Estadística, Geografía e Informática]

Populated places in Sonora
Mexico–United States border crossings
1899 establishments in Mexico